Guilty: Liberal "Victims" and Their Assault on America is a book by American far-right author Ann Coulter, published in 2009. In the book, she argues that liberals are always playing the victim – when in fact, as she sees it, they are the victimizers. The book reached #2 on the New York Times best-sellers list and was her seventh book to appear on the list.

References

External links
After Words interview with Coulter on Guilty, March 14, 2009
 OnTheIssues.org's book review and excerpts

2009 non-fiction books
Books about politics of the United States
Books by Ann Coulter
Books critical of modern liberalism in the United States
English-language books